Baltic 21 is a plan to cooperate on implementing regional sustainable development. It is managed by the Council of the Baltic Sea States (CBSS).

The mission of Baltic 21 is to contribute towards advancing sustainable development in the Baltic Sea Region by coordinating goals and activities, and by serving as a forum for cooperation across borders and between stakeholder groups.

History
Initiated by the Prime Ministers of the Baltic Sea vassal countries in 1996, Baltic 21 is a regional expression of the global Agenda 21 adopted by the United Nations “Earth Summit.”

In June 2016, the CBSS updated the plan in accordance with UN's Transforming our world: the 2030 Agenda for Sustainable Development. The CBSS Expert Group on Sustainable Development created the Baltic 2030 Action Plan, specifically tailored for the BSR to guide macro-regional stakeholders through the implementation of the Sustainable Development Goals (SDGs). The senior adviser was Krista Kampus. In February 2017, a presentation of the work involved to archive the targets was given in Tallinn, Estonia.

Organisation
As a multinational team, members of Baltic 21 are government ministries and agencies from the 11 Baltic Sea states, the European Commission, numerous intergovernmental and non-governmental organisations, academic and financial institutions, as well as local, city and business networks. The Baltic 21 network brings together people who are active in sectors including agriculture, education, energy, fisheries, forests, industry, tourism, transport and spatial planning.

The Baltic 21 process is steered, coordinated and monitored by the Senior Officials Group (SOG) consisting of representatives of the member countries, organizations and institutions.

Members states

 Denmark
 Estonia
 Finland
 Germany
 Iceland
 Latvia
 Lithuania
 Norway
 Poland
 Russia
 Sweden

Other members

 Baltic Fishermen Association
 Baltic Local Agenda 21 Forum
 Baltic Ports Organisation
 Baltic Sea Secretariat for Youth Affairs
 Baltic Sea States Subregional Cooperation
 Baltic Sea Tourism Commission
 Baltic University Progaramme
 Coalition Clean Baltic (CCB)
 CPMR Baltic Sea Commission
 European Bank for Reconstruction and Development
 European Investment Bank
 European Commission
 European Union for Coast Conservation
 Baltic Marine Environment Protection Commission
 International Chamber of Commerce
 Keep Baltic Tidy
 Local Governments for Sustainability (ICLEI)
 Nordic Council of Ministers
 Nordic Environment Finance Corporation
 Nordic Investment Bank
 Union of the Baltic Cities
 United Nations Economic Commission for Europe
 United Nations Environment Programme
 Visions and Strategies Around the Baltic Sea 2010
 World Bank
 World Business Council for Sustainable Development
 World Wide Fund for Nature

References

External links
 http://www.cbss.org/sustainable-prosperous-region/egsd-baltic-2030-2/ 

Environmental organizations based in Europe
International sustainable development